James Podsiadly (born 10 September 1981) is a former professional Australian rules football player who played for the Geelong Football Club and the Adelaide Football Club in the Australian Football League (AFL).

Early life
Podsiadly grew up in the Melbourne suburb of Spotswood. Growing up he played soccer and tennis, and began playing football seriously at the age of 17.  When Podsiadly was ten, his grandfather became a significant influence in his life.  Podsiadly's grandfather was a soldier in the Polish army during World War II, was captured and spent 12 months in a concentration camp near the German town of Arnsberg.  His grandfather and grandmother emigrated to Australia in the mid-1940s.

Pre-VFL career
Originally playing for the Yarraville Football Club and the Western Jets, Podsiadly was recruited by Essendon in the 1999 AFL Rookie Draft with pick 58. After playing 19 games with Essendon's reserves team in the VFL, Podsiadly was de-listed but was once again drafted as Collingwood selected him in the 2001 AFL Rookie Draft with the eighth pick.

Podsiadly played three games for Collingwood in the AFL pre-Season competition of 2002. However, he did not play senior football during the regular season and was delisted at the end of the year. He played for Collingwood's  Williamstown over that time, and was the club's leading goalkicker in 2002.

VFL career
Before being recruited back to an AFL list, Podsiadly played seven seasons in the Victorian Football League (VFL). He qualified for VFL life membership in 2009, represented the VFL in three state games and was named in the VFL's team of the year in 2005, 2006, 2008 and 2009.

Werribee (2003–2008)
Podsiadly was recruited by the VFL club Werribee for the 2003 season. He won the club's best & fairest award and the Frosty Miller medal as the VFL's leading goalkicker in 2005, breaking Nick Sautner's six-year winning streak. During the 2005 AFL pre-season he trained with Werribee's former AFL affiliate, the Western Bulldogs and then in 2006 with Richmond.

During the 2008 VFL season, Podsiadly played his 100th game for Werribee and won his second best and fairest at the club. He also won the 2008 J. J. Liston Trophy.

Geelong VFL (2009)
After six seasons with Werribee, Podsiadly left the club to take up a dual role as a player and fitness coach at the Geelong VFL club. He captained the side in the 2009 VFL season, won the club's best & fairest award and was their leading goal-kicker, with 68 goals.

AFL career

Geelong (2010–2013)
Podsiadly was selected as a mature-age rookie by Geelong in the 2009 AFL rookie draft at the age of 28 and played his first AFL game against Fremantle in round three of 2010.  He was awarded 13 Brownlow Medal votes in his first year of AFL football.

During the 2011 season, Podsiadly kicked 52 goals and averaged over 12 disposals per game. Podsiadly played in the 2011 AFL Grand Final, where Geelong beat . He was substituted out of the game in the second quarter after suffering a shoulder injury. He went on to play 18 and 16 games in the 2012 and 2013 seasons respectively.

At the end of the 2013 season, Geelong delisted Podsiadly, who thereby became an unrestricted free agent. He indicated that he was interested in playing with another club in 2014.

Adelaide (2014–2015)
Podsiadly started well at his new club in 2014, missing only one game for the season. He took 41 contested marks, ranked fourth in the AFL, and kicked 26 goals in 21 games, swinging between attack and defence. In round 18, Podsiadly played his 100th AFL game against  at the MCG.

Podsiadly announced his retirement at the end of the 2015 AFL season, during which he failed to play a senior game for the Crows.

Statistics

|- style="background:#eaeaea;"
! scope="row" style="text-align:center" | 2010
| style="text-align:center" | 
| 31 || 19 || 49 || 28 || 164 || 89 || 253 || 130 || 40 || 2.6 || 1.5 || 8.6 || 4.7 || 13.3 || 6.8 || 2.1
|-
! scope="row" style="text-align:center" | 2011
| style="text-align:center" | 
| 31 || 23 || 52 || 38 || 189 || 92 || 281 || 130 || 48 || 2.3 || 1.6 || 8.2 || 4.0 || 12.2 || 5.7 || 2.1
|- style="background:#eaeaea;"
! scope="row" style="text-align:center" | 2012
| style="text-align:center" | 
| 31 || 18 || 35 || 13 || 153 || 62 || 215 || 90 || 50 || 1.9 || 0.7 || 8.5 || 3.4 || 11.9 || 5.0 || 2.8
|-
! scope="row" style="text-align:center" | 2013
| style="text-align:center" | 
| 31 || 23 || 33 || 18 || 218 || 102 || 320 || 135 || 52 || 1.4 || 0.8 || 9.5 || 4.4 || 13.9 || 5.9 || 2.3
|- style="background:#eaeaea;"
! scope="row" style="text-align:center" | 2014
| style="text-align:center" | 
| 1 || 21 || 26 || 14 || 189 || 101 || 290 || 119 || 37 || 1.2 || 0.7 || 9.0 || 4.8 || 13.8 || 5.7 || 1.8
|-
! scope="row" style="text-align:center" | 2015
| style="text-align:center" | 
| 1 || 0 || — || — || — || — || — || — || — || — || — || — || — || — || — || — 
|- class="sortbottom"
! colspan=3| Career
! 104
! 195
! 111
! 913
! 446
! 1359
! 604
! 227
! 1.9
! 1.1
! 8.8
! 4.3
! 13.1
! 5.8
! 2.2
|}

References

External links

1981 births
Geelong Football Club players
Geelong Football Club Premiership players
Adelaide Football Club players
Werribee Football Club players
J. J. Liston Trophy winners
Living people
Australian rules footballers from Melbourne
Australian people of Polish descent
Western Jets players
Adelaide Football Club (SANFL) players
Williamstown Football Club players
One-time VFL/AFL Premiership players
People from the City of Hobsons Bay